Alling & Cory Buffalo Warehouse is a historic warehouse building located at Buffalo in Erie County, New York.  It consists of a six-story, "L" shaped,  former paper warehouse building built in 1910-1911 for the Alling & Cory company of Rochester, with a one-story, brick loading dock addition built in 1926.  It is built of reinforced concrete with classical detailing and considered to be of the "Daylight Factory" design.  The building has been rehabilitated into an apartment complex.

It was listed on the National Register of Historic Places in 2010.

References

Buildings and structures in Buffalo, New York
Industrial buildings completed in 1911
Industrial buildings and structures on the National Register of Historic Places in New York (state)
1911 establishments in New York (state)
National Register of Historic Places in Buffalo, New York